Prep & Landing is a computer animated television special, based on an idea by Chris Williams at Walt Disney Animation Studios and developed by Kevin Deters and Stevie Wermers-Skelton into a half-hour Christmas special. It first aired December 8, 2009 on ABC.

The special was released online the next day, along with an original one-minute short film Tiny's BIG Adventure. A sequel, Operation: Secret Santa, aired on December 7, 2010, reprising the original cast with the addition of Betty White as Mrs. Claus. The second half-hour Christmas TV special, Prep & Landing: Naughty vs. Nice aired on December 5, 2011, on ABC, with another holiday special being planned for the future.

Plot 
Wayne, a Christmas elf, is part of an elite organization known as "Prep & Landing", whose job is to ready millions of homes around the world for Santa Claus's visit. After working with "Prep & Landing" for 227 years, Wayne looks forward to getting promoted to director of the naughty list. Instead, his former partner and trainee, Peterson, gets the promotion. Wayne is introduced to Lanny, a freshly graduated rookie, whom Wayne has to also train.

Wayne is still bitter about the promotion, and decides to slack off during a mission. He permits Lanny to do all of the work, which is disastrous. Meanwhile, Santa is informed mid-flight of a massive snow storm and that Wayne and Lanny have not fully prepared the house yet. He is told to cancel the landing, which has never happened before; they promise to make it up for Timmy, a boy living at the house. Wayne and Lanny discover that the re-routing was a final decision, but after hearing Timmy thank them in his sleep, Wayne decides to fix it. He calls up Santa, telling him that he must land at Timmy's house. Wayne and Lanny then work together to land Santa safely on Timmy's roof. On Christmas morning, Santa shows Wayne that Timmy had a merry Christmas. Santa offers a promotion to Wayne as the director of the nice list, but he turns it down so he can work with Lanny.

Cast 
 Dave Foley as Wayne, the main character. He worked in "Prep & Landing" for years and looked forward to being promoted to Director of Naughty List Intelligence, but he was stuck with Lanny to train as his partner. His call sign is "Little Drummer Boy".
 Derek Richardson as Lanny, an overly enthusiastic "Prep & Landing" rookie, who was given by Magee to Wayne to train. He looks up to Wayne, being his biggest fan. His call sign is "Tree Skirt" and his catchphrase is "This is soo tinsel!".
 Sarah Chalke as Magee, the North Pole Christmas Eve Command Center Coordinator (NPCECCC) for Santa's flight. She was promoted to her current position from Toy Design after not listening to her friend Jerry and taking the job (something she admittedly regrets). Her call sign is "Jingle Belle." She is almost never seen without a mug of eggnog or cocoa in her hand. She is seen to get very stressed under pressure. This is most evident when she faints after Santa's sleigh almost slides off a roof.
 W. Morgan Sheppard as 'The Big Guy' Santa Claus. His call sign is "Partridge".  "Pear Tree" is his sleigh (in flight) (The coded message "The Partridge is in the Pear Tree" means Santa is in the sleigh) and "Big Red" (a tall, red, Candlestick telephone) is the phone Magee uses to call him.
 Mason Vale Cotton as Timmy Terwelp, an excited young boy who befriends Wayne before he is put back to bed only seconds later. He takes a picture of Wayne which is promptly deleted by Lanny.
 Nathan Greno and David DeLuise as Dasher and Dancer (respectively), Santa's lead reindeer. Their call sign, along with the other six reindeer is "Eight Maids 'a Milking", something Dasher hates.
 Hayes Macarthur as Thrasher, Dasher's aggressive cousin and Reindeer for "Prep & Landing". Thrasher's P&L transport was the last one out before Santa's flight, making it imperative that Wayne and Lanny get on board.  According to Lanny, Thrasher is a myth to those outside P&L.
 Tiny is Magee's assistant in the command center. He has his own short film on-line, "Tiny's Big Adventure," which takes place during the show. Tiny attempts to get Magee a new cup of cocoa, but misses the last cup and has to make a new one, something quite difficult since he cannot reach the storage shelf. So, he tries using a broom to reach the storage shelf, but it knocks down other cups. It also causes the can of Yuletide Gae to dump into the Coffee pot and the can to fall onto his head and he accidentally bumps into the dispenser of Fun Nog, causing it to fall on him, spilling it all over him. Then, the Coffee pot is done making the cocoa and he gets up, puts the cocoa in a cup and takes it to Magee. But when she drinks it, it tastes awful and she asks if he could try no Decaf and Tiny sighs. All that is shown of Tiny is the top of his hat, but, when Wayne threatens to expose Magee and Tiny's relationship, we see it point straight up with alarm.
 Peter Jacobson as Waterkotte
 Kasha Kropinski as Miss Holly, Santa's Executive Assistant.
 Lino DiSalvo as Gristletoe Joe

Production 
Prep and Landing was originally pitched by director Chris Williams as a short film for the newly re-opened shorts program at Walt Disney Animation Studios. Liking the idea, John Lasseter (Chief Creative Officer of Disney Animation) considered it to work best as a television special. ABC executives, keen to repeat the success of the 2007 DreamWorks Animation special Shrek the Halls, approved the project.

Following Williams' directorial debut on the short film Glago's Guest, he was moved on to co-direct the feature film Bolt. The special continued production under directors Kevin Deters and Stevie Wermers-Skelton's (Goofy's How to Hook Up Your Home Theater) control.

Release 
The original premiere date was scheduled for December 1; however, a speech at the United States Military Academy in West Point, New York on his Afghan war strategy by President Barack Obama delayed the special's debut one week to December 8, 2009.

The special was released on DVD on November 22, 2011, along with the short films Tiny's BIG Adventure and Operation: Secret Santa. It was also released on DVD and Blu-ray of Prep & Landing: Totally Tinsel Collection on November 6, 2012, together with Operation: Secret Santa, Naughty vs. Nice, and Tiny's BIG Adventure.

Hidden gags 
Prep & Landing includes a number of references and in-jokes left by the animators. Many pay homage to other Christmas specials and traditions. For example, Magee's office has the Christmas tree from A Charlie Brown Christmas. Magee's coffee mug from Dr. H Dentistry is a nod to Hermey the Elf from the claymation Rudolph The Red Nosed Reindeer. When Wayne prepares to enter Santa's office, Miss Holly is typing the lyrics to "Jingle Bells". The clear to launch acknowledgement given by the flight controllers during the pre-launch check is "Dash away", and Magee's final clearance is "Dash away all" from the poem A Visit from St. Nicholas ("Dash away, dash away, dash away all"). Timmy Terwelp himself is named in honor of Tiny Tim, a character from Charles Dickens' classic A Christmas Carol.

Others are related to Disney itself. Mickey's Christmas Carol is shown on the television of Lanny and Wayne's assigned house. The latitude and longitude given for Timmy's house (N 34' 9' 20" / W 118' 19' 23") are of The Walt Disney Company's world headquarters in Burbank, California. A license plate with the characters "12501 WED" is a reference to the birth date of Walt Disney. The German Shepherd shown in the prologue getting dusted to sleep was a recolored version of the titular character of the 2008 film Bolt, which was completing production as Prep & Landing was being made. Timmy's night-light features Goofy in a pose from the poster for the theatrical short How to Hook Up Your Home Theater.

Lastly, some of the references were inspired by the show's co-director, Kevin Deters. During a scene in which Wayne is "being naughty" and making himself a drink, the milk carton Wayne is using has the logo of Deter's Dairy, a real-life dairy located in Quincy, Illinois, Kevin Deters' hometown. A toy giraffe in Timmy's bedroom is based on a similar toy belonging to one of Deters' children. When Santa shows Wayne what happened at Timmy's house Christmas morning, the home shown is based on Deters' boyhood home.

Ratings 

T - Tied for that slot in that week.

Awards 
On December 1, 2009, prior to its first broadcast, Prep & Landing was nominated for nine Annie Awards in seven categories by the International Animated Film Association, ASIFA-Hollywood. It won three awards, including the award for Best Animated Television Production.

On February 10, 2010, "Prep & Landing" was nominated for two awards at the 8th Visual Effects Society Awards, winning in the Outstanding Visual Effects in a Broadcast Miniseries, Movie or Special category and losing in the Outstanding Animated Character in a Broadcast Program or Commercial category.

On August 21, 2010, Prep & Landing was honored with four Emmy Awards including the Outstanding Animated Program (for Programming Less Than One Hour) category.

Comic 
An 8-page comic story, titled Prep & Landing: Mansion Impossible, was released on November 16, 2011, in Avengers #19, Marvel Adventures Super Heroes #20, and Marvel Adventures Spider-Man #20. The comic tells a story of Wayne and Lanny preparing Avengers Mansion for a visit from Santa. It was written by Kevin Deters, and illustrated by Joe Mateo.

See also 
 List of Christmas films
 List of Disney Animated Shorts and Featurettes
 Santa Claus in film
 Walt Disney Animation Studios

References

External links 

 
 

Christmas television specials
2009 computer-animated films
2000s Disney animated short films
2009 television specials
2000s animated television specials
American Broadcasting Company television specials
2000s American television specials
Disney television specials
American Christmas films
2009 films
2010s Christmas films
2009 short films
Films scored by Michael Giacchino
Emmy Award-winning programs
American Christmas television specials
Santa Claus in television
Elves in popular culture
Films directed by Kevin Deters
2010s American films